Mama Alludu is a 1990 Telugu-language comedy film, produced by Dasari Narayana Rao and directed by Relangi Narasimha Rao. It stars Rajendra Prasad, Dasari Narayana Rao and Vani Viswanath. The film was remade in Kannada as Hendtheere Hushar (1992) and in Tamil as Purushanai Kaikulla Poottukanum (1994).

Plot 
Bhavani Devi (Jayachitra) a proud, arrogant woman has written a book Bhartanu Longadisukotam Ela (How to Keep Husband in your Grip) and she thinks that in real life, she has succeeded in it. But no one knows that her husband Rajeswara Prasad (Dasari Narayana Rao) is a wayward husband who has all sorts of vices. They have an only daughter Jaya (Vani Viswanath), who also moves in the footsteps of her mother. Vijay (Rajendra Prasad) is an unemployed, educated, truthful guy. Jaya falls in love with him. After some time, Vijay joins as an employee in Rajeswara Prasad's company when he learns about their love affair and also knows that Vijay is his old childhood friend's son. Now Rajeswara Prasad decides to make Vijay his son-in-law under any circumstance. So, he tells so many lies to Bhavani Devi and makes Jaya's marriage with Vijay. After the marriage, both father-in-law and son-in-law keep a bet; Vijay says that family life runs on truth and honesty, whereas Rajeswara Prasad says it goes on manipulation and tactics and on another side, Bhavani Devi trains Jaya to keep her husband in her grip, which leads to a lot of misunderstandings. The rest of the story is about how the family sets to right and who wins the bet.

Cast 
Rajendra Prasad as Vijay
Dasari Narayana Rao as Rajeswara Prasad
Vani Viswanath as Jaya
Suthi Velu as Deku
Kaasi Viswanath as Watchman
Kallu Chidamdaram as Constable
Peketi Sivaram
Jayachitra as Bhavani Devi
Vijaya Lalitha as Chamundeswari
Anuradha as Alochana Devi
Devi as Lila
Chandrika as Patrika

Soundtrack 
Music composed by Vasu Rao.

References

External links 

1990 comedy films
1990 films
1990s Telugu-language films
Films directed by Relangi Narasimha Rao
Indian comedy films
Telugu films remade in other languages